The Toussaint River is a tributary of the north shore of the Gouin Reservoir, flowing in Quebec, in Canada in the administrative region of:
 Nord-du-Québec: Eeyou Istchee Baie-James (municipality), townships of Chambalon and Balete;
 Mauricie: territory of the town of La Tuque: townships of Balete, Marceau, Perrier and Toussaint.

The forestry is the main economic activity of this valley; recreational tourism activities, second.

The route 212 serves the village of Obedjiwan, Quebec which is located on a peninsula on the north shore of Gouin Reservoir. This road stretches north-east along the north shore of the Gouin Reservoir to a road curve located between Dubois Lake and Normandin Lake (Normandin River); then branches south-east to serve the east side of the Gouin Reservoir, and thus links La Tuque via the village of Wemotaci, Quebec. Some branches of forest roads serve the upper part of the valley of the Toussaint River.

The surface of the Toussaint River is usually frozen from mid-November to the end of April, however, safe ice circulation is generally from early December to late March.

Geography

Toponymy 
Formerly, this watercourse was designated "Baptiste River" and "rivière de la Rencontre" (English: "river of Encounter").

The toponym "Toussaint River" was formalized on December 5, 1968 at the Commission de toponymie du Québec, at the creation of this commission.

Notes and references

See also 

Rivers of Mauricie
Tributaries of the Saint-Maurice River
La Tuque, Quebec